is a Japanese punk rock band from Kumamoto, Japan that formed in 2010. They were signed to Pizza of Death Records in 2014.

On August 25, 2021, it was announced all three members tested positive for COVID-19.

Members

Kenta 
 Name: 
 Birth date: 
 Birthplace: Amakusa, Kumamoto
 Position: Vocalist, Bassist

Ko-shin 
 Name: 
 Birth date: 
 Birthplace: Amakusa, Kumamoto
 Position: Guitarist, Chorus

Fuji 
 Name: 
 Birth date: 
 Birthplace: Kumamoto
 Position: Drums, Chorus

Discography

Albums

EPs

Singles

DVDs

Awards and nominations
MTV Video Music Awards Japan

|-
| 2017
| "Charm"
| Best Rock Video
| 
|}

References

External links
 Wanima Official Website
 Pizza of Death Records WANIMA Page

2010 establishments in Japan
Japanese punk rock groups
Japanese musical trios
Musicians from Kumamoto Prefecture
Musical groups established in 2010